A birthday is the anniversary of the birth of a person, or figuratively of an institution. Birthdays of people are celebrated in numerous cultures, often with birthday gifts, birthday cards, a birthday party, or a rite of passage.

Many religions celebrate the birth of their founders or religious figures with special holidays (e.g. Christmas, Mawlid, Buddha's Birthday, and Krishna Janmashtami).

There is a distinction between birthday and birthdate (also known as date of birth): the former, except for February 29, occurs each year (e.g. January 15), while the latter is the complete date when a person was born (e.g. January 15, 2001).

Legal conventions
In most legal systems, one becomes a legal adult on a particular birthday when they reach the age of majority (usually between 12 and 21), and reaching age-specific milestones confers particular rights and responsibilities. At certain ages, one may become eligible to leave full-time education, become subject to military conscription or to enlist in the military, to consent to sexual intercourse, to marry with parental consent, to marry without parental consent, to vote, to run for elected office, to legally purchase (or consume) alcohol and tobacco products, to purchase lottery tickets, or to obtain a driver's licence. The age of majority is the age when minors cease to legally be considered children and assume control over their persons, actions, and decisions, thereby terminating the legal control and legal responsibilities of their parents or guardians over and for them. Most countries set the age of majority at 18, though it varies by jurisdiction.

Cultural conventions

Many cultures have one or more coming of age birthdays:

 In Canada and the United States, families often mark a girl's 16th birthday with a "sweet sixteen" celebration – often represented in popular culture.
 In some Hispanic countries, as well as in Portuguese-speaking Brazil, the quinceañera (Spanish) or festa de quinze anos (Portuguese) celebration traditionally marks a girl's 15th birthday.
 In Nepal and India, on a child's first birthday, their head is shaved while being held by a special fire. Removal of the hair is believed to cleanse the child of any evil in past lives, and symbolizes a renewal of the soul. Hindu male children of some castes, like Brahmins, have the 12th or 13th birthday replaced with a grand "thread ceremony". The child takes a blessed thread and wears it, symbolizing his coming of age. This is called the Upanayana.
 In the Philippines, a coming-of-age party called a debut is held for young women on their 18th birthday, and for young men on their 21st birthday.
 In some Asian countries that follow the zodiac calendar, there is a tradition of celebrating the 60th birthday.
 In Korea, many celebrate a traditional ceremony of Baek-il (Feast for the 100th day) and Doljanchi (child's first birthday).
 In Japan there is a Coming of Age Day, for all of those who have turned 18 years of age.
 In British Commonwealth nations cards from the Royal Family are sent to those celebrating their 100th and 105th birthday and every year thereafter.
 In Ghana, on their birthday, children wake up to a special treat called "oto" which is a patty made from mashed sweet potato and eggs fried in palm oil. Later they have a birthday party where they usually eat stew and rice and a dish known as "kelewele", which is fried plantain chunks.
 Jewish boys have a bar mitzvah on their 13th birthday. Jewish girls have a bat mitzvah on their 12th birthday, or sometimes on their 13th birthday in Reform and Conservative Judaism. This marks the transition where they become obligated in commandments from which they were previously exempted and are counted as part of the community.

The birthdays of historically significant people, such as national heroes or founders, are often commemorated by an official holiday marking the anniversary of their birth. 
Catholic saints are remembered by a liturgical feast on the anniversary of their "birth" into heaven a.k.a. their day of death. The ancient Romans marked the anniversary of a temple dedication or other founding event as a dies natalis, a term still sometimes applied to the anniversary of an institution (such as a university).

An individual's Beddian birthday, named in tribute to firefighter Bobby Beddia, occurs during the year that their age matches the last two digits of the year they were born.

In many cultures and jurisdictions, if a person's real birthday is not known (for example, if they are an orphan), then their birthday may be adopted or assigned to a specific day of the year, such as January 1. The birthday of Jesus is celebrated at Christmas. Racehorses are reckoned to become one year old in the year following their birth on the first of January in the Northern Hemisphere and the first of August in the Southern Hemisphere.

Traditions

In many parts of the world, an individual's birthday is celebrated by a party where a specially made cake, usually decorated with lettering and the person's age, is presented. The cake is traditionally studded with the same number of lit candles as the age of the individual, or a number candle representing their age. The celebrated individual will usually make a silent wish and attempt to blow out the candles in one breath; if successful, a tradition holds that the wish will be granted. In many cultures, the wish must be kept secret or it won't "come true". Presents are bestowed on the individual by the guests appropriate to their age. Other birthday activities may include entertainment (sometimes by a hired professional, i.e. a clown, magician, or musician), and a special toast or speech by the birthday celebrant. The last stanza of Patty Hill's and Mildred Hill's famous song, "Good Morning to You" (unofficially titled "Happy Birthday to You") is typically sung by the guests at some point in the proceedings. In some countries a piñata takes the place of a cake.

Name days

In some historically Roman Catholic and Eastern Orthodox countries, it is common to have a 'name day', otherwise known as a 'Saint's day'. It is celebrated in much the same way as a birthday, but it is held on the official day of a saint with the same Christian name as the birthday person; the difference being that one may look up a person's name day in a calendar, or easily remember common name days (for example, John or Mary); however in pious traditions, the two were often made to concur by giving a newborn the name of a saint celebrated on its day of confirmation, more seldom one's birthday. Some are given the name of the religious feast of their christening's day or birthday, for example, Noel or Pascal (French for Christmas and "of Easter"); as another example, Togliatti was given Palmiro as his first name because he was born on Palm Sunday.

Official birthdays

Some notables, particularly monarchs, have an official birthday on a fixed day of the year, which may not necessarily match the day of their birth, but on which celebrations are held. Examples are:
 Jesus Christ's traditional birthday is celebrated as Christmas Eve or Christmas Day around the world, on December 24 or 25, respectively. As some Eastern churches use the Julian calendar, December 25 will fall on January 7 in the Gregorian calendar. These dates are traditional and have no connection with the actual birthday date of Jesus, which is not recorded in the Gospels.
 Similarly, the birthdays of the Virgin Mary and John the Baptist are liturgically celebrated on September 8 and June 24, especially in the Roman Catholic and Eastern Orthodox traditions (although for those Eastern Orthodox churches using the Julian calendar the corresponding Gregorian dates are September 21 and July 7 respectively). As with Christmas, the dates of these celebrations are traditional and probably have no connection with the actual birthdays of these individuals.
 The King's Official Birthday or Queen's Official Birthday in Australia, Fiji, Canada, New Zealand, and the United Kingdom.
 The Grand Duke's Official Birthday in Luxembourg is typically celebrated on June 23. This is different from the monarch's actual date of birth, which is on April 16.
 Koninginnedag in the Kingdom of the Netherlands was typically celebrated on April 30. Queen Beatrix fixed it at the birthday of her mother, the previous queen, to avoid the winter weather associated with her own birthday in January. The present monarch's birthday is 27 April, and is also celebrated on that day and has replaced the 30th of April celebration of Koninginnedag.
 The previous Japanese Emperor Showa (Hirohito)'s birthday was April 29. After his death, the holiday was kept as "Showa no Hi", or "Showa Day". This holiday falls close to Golden Week, the week in late April and early May.
 Kim Il-sung and Kim Jong-il's birthdays are celebrated in North Korea as national holidays called the Day of the Sun and the Day of the Shining Star respectively.
 Washington's Birthday, commonly referred to as Presidents' Day, is a federal holiday in the United States that celebrates the birthday of George Washington. President Washington's birthday is observed on the third Monday of February each year. However, his actual birth date was either February 11 (Old Style), or February 22 (New Style).
 In India, every year October 2 which marks the Birthday of Mahatma Gandhi, is declared as a holiday. All the liquor shops are closed across the country in honour of Gandhi not consuming liquor.
 Martin Luther King Jr. Day is a federal holiday in the United States marking the birthday of Martin Luther King Jr. It is observed on the third Monday of January each year, which is around the time of King's birthday, January 15.
 Mawlid is the official birthday of Muhammad and is celebrated on the 12th or 17th day of Rabi' al-awwal by adherents of Sunni and Shia Islam respectively. These are the two most commonly accepted dates of birth of Muhammad.

Distribution through the year 

Birthdays are fairly evenly distributed through the year, with some seasonal effects.

In the United States, there tend to be more births in September and October. This may be because there is a holiday season nine months before (the human gestation period is about nine months), or because the longest nights of the year also occur in the Northern Hemisphere nine months before. However, it appears the holidays have more of an effect on birth rates than the winter: New Zealand, a Southern Hemisphere country, has the same September and October peak with no corresponding peak in March and April. The least common birthdays tend to fall around public holidays, such as Christmas, New Year's Day and fixed-date holidays such as July 4 in the US.

In the United States between 1973 and 1999, September 16 is the most common birthday in the United States and December 25 the least common birthday (other than February 29, because of leap years). In 2011, October 5 and 6 were reported as the most frequently occurring birthdays.

In New Zealand, the most common birthday is September 29, and the least common birthday is December 25. The ten most common birthdays all fall within a thirteen-day period, between September 22 and October 4. The ten least common birthdays (other than February 29) are December 24–27, January 1–2, February 6, March 22, April 1 and April 25. This is based on all live births registered in New Zealand between 1980 and 2017.

Positive and negative associations with culturally significant dates may influence birth rates. The study shows a 5.3% decrease in spontaneous births and a 16.9% decrease in Caesarean births on Halloween, compared to dates occurring within one week before and one week after the October holiday. In contrast, on Valentine's Day there is a 3.6% increase in spontaneous births and a 12.1% increase in Caesarean births.

In Sweden 9.3% of the population is born in March and 7.3% in November when a uniform distribution would give 8.3%.

Leap day
In the Gregorian calendar (a common solar calendar), February in a leap year has 29 days instead of the usual 28, so the year lasts 366 days instead of the usual 365.

A person born on February 29 may be called a "leapling" or a "leaper". In common years, they usually celebrate their birthdays on February 28. In some situations, March 1 is used as the birthday in a non-leap year since it is the day following February 28.

Technically, a leapling will have fewer birthday anniversaries than their age in years. This phenomenon is exploited when a person claims to be only a quarter of their actual age, by counting their leap-year birthday anniversaries only. In Gilbert and Sullivan's 1879 comic opera The Pirates of Penzance, Frederic the pirate apprentice discovers that he is bound to serve the pirates until his 21st birthday rather than until his 21st year. For legal purposes, legal birthdays depend on how local laws count time intervals.

By religion

Judaism
In Judaism, the rabbis are divided about celebrating this custom, although it was accepted by the majority of the faithful. In the Torah the only mention that is made of the birthday, refers to the celebration of Pharaoh's birthday in Egypt, as recorded in Genesis (Parashat Vaieshev) 40:20.

Christianity

Early centuries
Origen in his commentary "On Levites" writes that Christians should not only refrain from celebrating their birthdays, but should look on them with disgust as a pagan custom. Saint's days were typically celebrated on the anniversary of their martyrdom or death, considered the occasion of or preparation for their entrance into Heaven or the New Jerusalem.

Medieval
Ordinary folk celebrated their saint's day (the saint they were named after), but nobility celebrated the anniversary of their birth. The "Squire's Tale", one of Chaucer's Canterbury Tales, opens as King Cambuskan proclaims a feast to celebrate his birthday.

Modern
The Catholic Church, the Eastern Orthodox Church and Protestantism, accept birthdays as part of their traditional culture. Jehovah's Witnesses abstain from it for a number of reasons including its pagan origins, its rejection by early Christians, the way it is negatively expounded in the Holy Scriptures and the customs associated with superstition and magic.

Islam
The birthday does not reflect Islamic tradition, and because of this, the majority of Muslims refrain from celebrating it while for some it is not a problem, as long as it is not accompanied by behavior contrary to Islamic tradition. A good portion of Muslims, (and Arab Christians), who have emigrated to the United States and Europe, celebrate birthdays as customary especially for children, while some abstain. There is also much controversy regarding the permissibility of celebrating Mawlid, (the anniversary of the birth of Muhammad), as some Muslims judge the custom as an unacceptable practice according to Islamic tradition.

Buddhism (Mahayana)

Many monasteries celebrate the anniversary of Buddha's birth, usually in a highly formal, ritualized manner. They treat Buddha's statue as if it was Buddha himself, as if he were alive; bathing, and "feeding" him.

Hinduism
Hindus celebrate the birth anniversary day every year when the day that corresponds to lunar month or solar month (Sun Signs Nirayana System – Sourava Mana Masa) of birth and has the same asterism (Star/Nakshatra) as that of the date of birth. That age is reckoned whenever Janma Nakshatra of the same month passes.

Hindus regard death to be more auspicious than birth since the person is liberated from the bondages of material society. Also, traditionally, rituals & prayers for the departed are observed on 5th and 11th day with many relatives gathering.

Sikhism
Sikhs celebrate the anniversary of the birth of Guru Nanak.

By region

Ancient Persia
According to Herodotus (5th century BC), of all the days in the year, the one which the Persians celebrate most is their birthday. It was customary to have the board furnished on that day with an ampler supply than common: the richer people eat wholly baked cow, horse, camel, or donkey, while the poorer classes use instead the smaller kinds of cattle.

Ancient Rome
The Romans enthusiastically celebrated birthdays with hedonistic parties and generous presents.

China

The Chinese word for "year(s) old"   suì) is entirely different from the usual word for "year(s)" (nián), reflecting the former importance of Chinese astrology and the belief that one's fate was bound to the stars imagined to be in opposition to the planet Jupiter at the time of one's birth. The importance of this duodecennial orbital cycle only survives in popular culture as the 12 animals of the Chinese zodiac, which change each Chinese New Year and may be used as a theme for some gifts or decorations. Because of the importance attached to the influence of these stars in ancient China and throughout the Sinosphere, East Asian age reckoning previously began with one at birth and then added years at each Chinese New Year, so that it formed a record of the suì one had lived through rather than of the exact amount of time from one's birth. This methodwhich can differ by as much as two years of age from other systemsis increasingly uncommon and is not used for official purposes in the PRC or on Taiwan, although the word suì is still used for describing age.

Traditionally, Chinese birthdayswhen celebratedwere reckoned using the lunisolar calendar, which varies from the Gregorian calendar by as much as a month forward or backward depending on the year. Celebrating the lunisolar birthday remains common on Taiwan while growing increasingly uncommon on the mainland. Birthday traditions reflected the culture's deep-seated focus on longevity and wordplay. Longevity noodles are another traditional food consumed on the day, although western-style birthday cakes are increasingly common among urban Chinese. Hongbaosred envelopes stuffed with money, now especially the red 100 RMB notesare the usual gift from relatives and close family friends for most children. Gifts for adults on their birthday are much less common, although the birthday for each decade is a larger occasion that might prompt a large dinner and celebration.

Japan 
The Japanese reckoned their birthdays by the Chinese system until the Meiji Reforms. Celebrations remained uncommon or muted until after the American occupation that followed World War II. Children's birthday parties are the most important, typically celebrated with a cake, candles, and singing. Adults often just celebrate with their partner.

North Korea
In North Korea, the Day of the Sun, Kim Il-sung's birthday, is the most important public holiday of the country, and Kim Jong-il's birthday is celebrated as the Day of the Shining Star. North Koreans are not permitted to celebrate birthdays on July 8 and December 17 because these were the dates of the deaths of Kim Il-sung and Kim Jong-il, respectively. More than 100,000 North Koreans celebrate displaced birthdays on July 9 and December 18 instead to avoid these dates. A person born on July 8 before 1994 may change their birthday, with official recognition.

South Korea 

South Korea is the last country to use a form of East Asian age reckoning for many official purposes. Currently, three systems are used together"Korean ages" that start with 1 at birth and increase every January 1st with the Gregorian New Year, "year ages" that start with 0 at birth and otherwise increase the same way, and "actual ages" that start with 0 at birth and increase each birthday. First birthday celebrations are heavily celebrated, despite usually having little to do with the child's age. However, this is scheduled to change in June 2023, when all Korean ages will be set back at least one year and official ages will henceforth be reckoned only by birthdays.

See also
 Various birthdays are mentioned on the pages devoted to each day of the year, from January 1 to December 31, see List of days of the year
 List of birthday songs
 Birthday problem
 Birthday attack
 Half-birthday
 Death anniversary/Yahrzeit
 Unbirthday
 Sashtiabdhapoorthi
 Birthstones

References

Notes

External links

What's your number?, by Population Action International
What's your number?, by the BBC